The Bear Creek Reservoir is a reservoir located in Franklin County, Alabama, along Bear Creek. No hydroelectric power is generated here.

References

See also
List of dams and reservoirs in the United States
List of lakes
List of Alabama dams and reservoirs

Reservoirs in Alabama
Bodies of water of Franklin County, Alabama
Dams in Alabama
Tennessee Valley Authority dams
Dams completed in 1969